Licaria is a flowering plant genus in the family Lauraceae, native to Central America and South America. It is a Neotropical genus with around 80 species.

Overview
Licaria is a Neotropical genus consisting of about 80 species distributed from southern Florida, Mexico to the south of Brazil and Bolivia. In Brazil, the occurrence of 20 species and two subspecies, mostly in the Amazon region (Kurz 2000). These trees have a resilient wood, useful as timber, for construction and as firewood.

Description 
They are evergreen monoecious, hermaphrodite, trees or rarely bushes. Leaves lax at the apex of the branches, without papillae on the abaxial epidermis of the leaves. The leaves are alternate or opposite but rarely opposite, entire, subcoriaceous in some species of Central America as Nicaragua, glabrous on the upper, glabrous or pubescent on the underside, pinnatinervium. Flowers in panicles terminating in a top. The inflorescences in axillary, paniculata so capitated, the tepals generally the same, with three stamens, the anthers exserted or included at anthesis, filaments free or fused.

Flowers monoclinic with hypanthium urceolate, not depressed below the tepals, tepals 6, generally erect, equal inner surface without papillae. Androecium with three stamens fertile, filaments generally the same width as anthers or more slender, anthers bilocelares: 1st and 2nd series with stamens absent or transformed into staminodes; third grade with 3 stamens, a pair of glands at the base of fiaments present, reduced, never fused, or absent, anthers introrse or extrorse-apical; estaminodial fourth grade absent or rarely present with 3 staminodes. The fruit is a berry with deciduous tepals.

Species
Species accepted by the Plants of the World Online as of 2022:

Licaria agglomerata 
Licaria alata 
Licaria applanata 
Licaria areolata 
Licaria armeniaca 
Licaria aurea 
Licaria aureosericea 
Licaria bahiana 
Licaria brasiliensis 
Licaria brenesii 
Licaria brittoniana 
Licaria camara 
Licaria campechiana 
Licaria cannella 
Licaria capitata 
Licaria caribaea 
Licaria carinata 
Licaria caryophyllata 
Licaria caudata 
Licaria cervantesii 
Licaria chinanteca 
Licaria chrysophylla 
Licaria clarensis 
Licaria clavata 
Licaria cogolloi 
Licaria colombiana 
Licaria comata 
Licaria conoidea 
Licaria crassifolia 
Licaria cubensis 
Licaria cufodontisii 
Licaria debilis 
Licaria deltoidea 
Licaria dolichantha 
Licaria endlicheriifolia 
Licaria excelsa 
Licaria exserta 
Licaria filiformis 
Licaria glaberrima 
Licaria guatemalensis 
Licaria guianensis 
Licaria herrerae 
Licaria hirsuta 
Licaria ibarrae 
Licaria latifolia 
Licaria leonis 
Licaria lucida 
Licaria macrophylla 
Licaria martiniana 
Licaria mexicana 
Licaria misantlae 
Licaria multiflora 
Licaria multinervis 
Licaria mutisii 
Licaria nayaritensis 
Licaria nitida 
Licaria oppositifolia 
Licaria pachycarpa 
Licaria parvifolia 
Licaria peckii 
Licaria pergamentacea 
Licaria phymatosa 
Licaria polyphylla 
Licaria pucheri 
Licaria quercina 
Licaria quirirafuina 
Licaria rodriguesii 
Licaria rufotomentosa 
Licaria sarapiquensis 
Licaria sclerophylla 
Licaria sericea 
Licaria sessiliflora 
Licaria siphonantha 
Licaria spiritusanctensis 
Licaria subbullata 
Licaria subsessilis 
Licaria tenuifolia 
Licaria terminalis 
Licaria tomentosa 
Licaria triandra 
Licaria trinervis 
Licaria urceolata 
Licaria velutina 
Licaria vernicosa

References

H. Kurz. Fortpflanzungsbiologie einiger Gattungen neotropischer Lauraceen und Revision der Gattung Licaria. Dissertation zur Erlangung der Doktorwürde des Fachbereichs Biologie. Universität Hamburg, Hamburg. 1983.

Lauraceae genera
Taxonomy articles created by Polbot
Neotropical realm flora
Lauraceae